The Ash Hollow Formation of the Ogallala Group is a geological formation found in Nebraska and South Dakota. It preserves fossils dating back to the Neogene period.  It was named after Ash Hollow, Nebraska and can be seen in Ash Hollow State Historical Park. Ashfall Fossil Beds State Historical Park is within this formation.

Fossil content

Mammals

Bats

Carnivorans

Eulipotyphlans

Lagomorphs

Rodents

Ungulates

Proboscideans

Reptiles

Birds

Crocodilians

Squamates

Testudines

Amphibians

Plants

See also

 List of fossiliferous stratigraphic units in South Dakota
 Paleontology in South Dakota
 List of fossiliferous stratigraphic units in Nebraska
 Paleontology in Nebraska

References

 

Neogene United States
Neogene geology of Nebraska
Neogene geology of South Dakota
Neogene geology of Wyoming
Lagerstätten